Biggest Loser Jeetega is an Indian reality series based on America's The Biggest Loser but adapted to the needs of the Indian market. It was hosted by Suniel Shetty and aired on Sahara One.

Synopsis
The show featured sixteen obese contestants from India, who competed with each other to lose the most weight. The contestants were divided into two teams, where each was assigned a trainer. Andrew Leipus, former physiotherapist to the Indian Cricket Team was the overall trainer and he was joined by Deepika Mehta and Yusef Khan. Varun Shivdasani was the program's chef.

Sandeep Sachdev was the winner of Season 1.

References

Jeetega
Sahara One original programming
Indian game shows
2007 Indian television series debuts
2007 Indian television series endings
Indian television series based on American television series